The Best Science Fiction of Isaac Asimov, published in 1986, is a collection of 28 short stories by American writer Isaac Asimov, personally selected as favorites by himself.

Content
 "All the Troubles of the World"
 "A Loint of Paw" 
 "The Dead Past" 
 "Death of a Foy" 
 "Dreaming Is a Private Thing" 
 "Dreamworld" 
 "Eyes Do More Than See" 
 "The Feeling of Power" 
 "Flies" 
 "Found!" 
 "The Foundation of S.F. Success" 
 "Franchise" 
 "The Fun They Had" 
 "How It Happened" 
 "I Just Make Them Up, See!" 
 "I'm in Marsport Without Hilda" 
 "The Immortal Bard" 
 "It's Such a Beautiful Day" 
 "Jokester" 
 "The Last Answer" 
 "The Last Question" 
 "My Son, the Physicist" 
 "Obituary" 
 "Spell My Name with an S" 
 "Strikebreaker" 
 "Sure Thing" 
 "The Ugly Little Boy" 
 "Unto the Fourth Generation"

Reception
Dave Langford reviewed The Best Science Fiction of Isaac Asimov for White Dwarf #88, and stated that "Some OK stuff here, but little that's unfamiliar."

Reviews
Review by Donald M. Hassler (1986) in Fantasy Review, October 1986
Review by Jim England (1987) in Vector 137
Review by Don D'Ammassa (1987) in Science Fiction Chronicle, #92 May 1987
Review by Terry Broome (1988) in Paperback Inferno, #74

References

External links
The Best Science Fiction of Isaac Asimov at books.zog.org – 
 

1986 short story collections
Doubleday (publisher) books
Science fiction short story collections by Isaac Asimov